The Chateauguay Valley is an area of southwestern Quebec Canada, roughly encompassing the drainage basin of the Chateauguay River which flows from the Adirondack Mountains in northern New York state and joins the Saint Lawrence River near Montreal, Quebec.

The Valley is mainly made up of rural communities and is known for its agriculture and apple orchards.

It includes the area roughly stretching from Dundee and Huntingdon in the west to Hemmingford in the east and north to Châteauguay.

External links

ChateauguayValley.ca - Online Chateauguay Valley Region Community based Newspaper : Sharing original articles, News, information and links about the Chateauguay Valley region and beyond!
Map of the Chateauguay River watershed and the Chateauguay Valley in Canada
 Map of the entire Chateauguay River watershed
 Photographs of the area
 Battle of the Châteauguay National Historic Site of Canada
 Ormstown Fair
The Valley of the Chateauguay River
The Russeltown Flatts Church
 It's My Town - Participatory news site for the Chateauguay Valley

River valleys of Canada
Valleys of Quebec
Landforms of Montérégie
Roussillon Regional County Municipality
Les Jardins-de-Napierville Regional County Municipality
Le Haut-Saint-Laurent Regional County Municipality